The 2023 Nigerian presidential election in Akwa Ibom State will be held on 25 February 2023 as part of the nationwide 2023 Nigerian presidential election to elect the president and vice president of Nigeria. Other federal elections, including elections to the House of Representatives and the Senate, will also be held on the same date while state elections will be held two weeks afterward on 11 March.

Background
Akwa Ibom State is a small state in the South South mainly populated by Efik-Ibibio peoples; although its oil reserves make it one of the most wealthy states in the nation, Akwa Ibom has faced challenges in security, environmental degradation, and lack of affordable housing in large part due to years of systemic corruption.

Politically, the state's 2019 elections were categorized as a reassertion of the PDP's dominance after Senator Godswill Akpabio and his allies that switched to the APC lost. Statewise, Governor Udom Emmanuel (PDP) easily won re-election with nearly 75% of the vote and 25 of 26 House of Assembly seats were won by the PDP. The PDP was also successful federally, unseating all APC senators and house members to sweep all three senate and ten House of Representatives seats as the state was easily won by PDP presidential nominee Atiku Abubakar with about 68% but still swung towards the APC and had lower turnout.

Polling

Projections

General election

Results

By senatorial district 
The results of the election by senatorial district.

By federal constituency
The results of the election by federal constituency.

By local government area 
The results of the election by local government area.

See also 
 2023 Akwa Ibom State elections
 2023 Nigerian presidential election

Notes

References 

Akwa Ibom State gubernatorial election
2023 Akwa Ibom State elections
Akwa Ibom